Germany has taken many forms throughout the history of censorship in the country. Various regimes have restricted the press, cinema, literature, and other entertainment venues. In contemporary Germany, the Grundgesetz (Basic Law) generally guarantees freedom of press, speech, and opinion. 

Today, censorship is mainly exerted in the form of restriction of access to certain media (examples include motion pictures and video games) to older adolescents or adults, as well as perceived online fake news, hate speech and misinformation. 

Furthermore, the publication of works violating the rights of the individual or those considered to be capable of inciting popular hatred (Volksverhetzung) may be prohibited. Possession of such works (including Adolf Hitler's Mein Kampf), however, is generally not punishable. As of 2022, Germany is ranked 22nd on the Press Freedom Index.

Before 1871
Most of the various smaller German states that later became the modern nation-state of Germany had censorship laws that severely restricted press freedom and made criticism of the government difficult or impossible.  In large measure these were a result of the 1819 Carlsbad Decrees which, inter alia, expanded the censorship of the press.  Censorship was enforced through the requirement to have a government license to publish books or newspapers, and the mandatory use of an impressum on printed material to identify authors and publishers. However, the city-republics such as Frankfurt and Hamburg tended to have a free press, a rarity in 19th century Germany. The Prussian invasion, occupation and annexation of Frankfurt was in large part motivated by the Prussian government's irritation with the Frankfurt free press; unlike Frankfurt Prussia had severe censorship laws.

German Empire (1871–1918)

In the German Empire, many forms of media were under imperial control. Before World War I, the government appointed civil administrators and bureaucrats who were in charge of ensuring the public decency of printed material within the Empire.

The Imperial Press Law of 1874 ended the government's right to censor materials before publishing. It also eliminated the need for a government-issued license to publish. However, the government retained the right to be notified of all publications when printing began and could prosecute editors for the content featured in their works. Most often, editors were imprisoned for the publication of material which insulted the monarch. At this point, theatres, cinemas, cabarets, and music halls were still subject to state licensing. Police had direct control over these venues.

Although overall restrictions on film were not codified into law at this time, movies were monitored and regulated. However, this process was subjective and varied case-by-case and locality by locality. The local government cut and banned any material deemed to be against their best interests. Universal state regulation across the entire Empire began in 1906 when several local police forces formed a collective task force to ban films involving  Hennig, a German murderer and fugitive, escaped arrest and embarrassed the police force. Officials hoping to contain news of his escape banned the film. In May 1906, government officials passed a police ordinance requiring that every film shown in Berlin must be examined by the police before it could be presented to public audiences. However, as the number of films and productions increased, it became difficult for police to regulate every work. As such, they attended screenings randomly to check for legal and moral compliance.

Although the state censorship authorities deployed officers all over the Empire, some localities set up their own field offices. The first of these field offices were established in 1912 in the cities of Munich and Stuttgart. These offices often created their own additional compliance requirements, but all films remained subject to the standards established by the state.

With the outbreak of World War I, the military took over the censorship office with the aim of mobilizing German support for the war. A police official was appointed in every city for this purpose. Restrictions on materials became much harsher. Materials could be banned because of association with a particular person or country, or simply because the censor felt that the piece was distracting or a waste of time. Newspapers could be suspended for days at a time as punishment for the publication of "inappropriate material".

Weimar Republic (1918–1933)

Article 118 of the Weimar constitution banned censorship, but excepted film, indecent and obscene literature, and measures at public events to protect youth. Article 48 allowed the President to suspend this guarantee in order to restore public safety and order, with veto power over such actions given to the Reichstag.

An exception to this article was film. The film industry was regulated by the Film Assessment Headquarters. The purpose of this organization was to censor films released in Germany for pornography and other indecent content.

The Gesetz zur Bewahrung der Jugend vor Schund- und Schmutzschriften (“Law for the Protection of Youth from Trash and Filth Writings”) of 18 December 1926 provided for the partial censorship (restrictions on distribution) of printed materials in the interest of youth welfare, though it was only applied post-publication on a case-by-case basis. Furthermore, it incorporated limits to what could be censored and on what grounds; printed materials could not be added to the index for political, social, religious, ethical, or world-view-related reasons. However, the goal of this regulation was to restrict content that could ruin the youth intellectually, morally, and physically. Such "harmful" content included dime novels, serialized books, and dramatic pamphlets.

The Weimar Republic maintained a number of criminal provisions for hate crimes and anti-Semitic expression. In response to violent political agitators such as the Nazis, authorities censored advocacy of violence and criticism of the government. Emergency decrees were issued giving the power to censor newspapers, and hundreds of Nazi newspapers were shut down. Hitler was prevented from speaking in several German states, and leading Nazis such Goebbels were sentenced to jail time for violating hate speech laws.

Nazi Germany (1933–1945)

Shortly after Adolf Hitler rose to power in 1933, he established the Ministry of Propaganda with the goal that this agency would control all forms of mass communication in Germany. At its peak of influence, the Ministry employed 1,500 employees spanning 17 departments. Censorship policy was produced and implemented by the Reich Minister of Propaganda, Joseph Goebbels. As such, Goebbels oversaw the publication of all media that was to be widely distributed — literature, music, newspapers, and public events. Any material that threatened the reputation of Hitler's government or spoke ill of the regime was immediately censored and retracted. Additionally, books that were already in circulation and written by Jewish authors were collected and burned. Nazi bureaucrats saw their work and information control as necessary. It was, in their minds their duty to protect the German public from the harms of "undesirable books".

The control of information among young people was especially vital to the German government. On May 10, 1933, shortly after the Nazis rose to power, the government burned one-third of the total library holdings in Germany. As soldiers burned at least 25,000 books in the center of Berlin, Goebbels spoke of the evils of literature and encouraged massive crowds to say “No to decadence and moral corruption!”. This event began a widespread effort to illustrate government control and align public opinion with party ideology.

The aim of censorship under the Nazi regime was simple: to reinforce Nazi power and to suppress opposing viewpoints and information.

Divided Germany

East Germany (1945–1990)

According to the Constitution of the German Democratic Republic (Deutsche Demokratische Republik), censorship of any kind was forbidden. However, the government of the GDR took measures to ensure that all publications were in line with their ideological grounding.

The Office of Head Administration for Publishing and Book Trade was tasked with regulating all material published within the GDR. The office aimed to produce material that was both politically correct and a reflection of communist values; however, the office was often advertised to the public as “a means for improving the quality of literature.” Most division chiefs were literary figures with a history of party loyalty; oftentimes a former head of a publishing house or an author filled the role.   In order to have material published and printed, an author or publisher had to submit the work to the Office and acquire a permit. Writers typically experienced a processing time of one to two months. Refusal to publish was not uncommon; a team of six typically rejected 250 manuscripts each year after receiving around 600. Approved books were published and around 10,000 copies of each book entered circulation.

Other types of art were also highly regulated. Permission was required to exhibit or perform any visual art. In addition, journalists without government approval were not hired.

The primary goal of East German censorship - whether it be to regulate books, movies, or other forms of art - was to protect the interests of communism and its implementation. Works critical of the East German or Soviet governments were forbidden, as were any works which seemed sympathetic to fascism.

Around 1989, as the people of East Germany grew more and more displeased with the state of the country, the rejection of material that celebrated West Germany heightened. Thousands of East Germans were fleeing west and the demand for West German materials - films, books, and magazines - was on the rise. As a result, the literature market for East German publications suffered. Books sat undistributed in Office warehouses as the demand for material was nearly nonexistent.

West Germany (1945–1990)

In the immediate aftermath of World , the West German media was subject to censorship by the forces of the Allied occupation. Authors, publishers, distributors, and sellers were all subject to prosecution for spreading "poisonous material". Content displaying communist affections or anti-democracy leanings were most heavily regulated. The most celebrated characteristic of acceptable publications was party loyalty; West German Government officials repressed any content that did not allude to political support and nationalism. Publications void of total party support were taken off the shelves amid discovery and added to a blacklist. In all, around 30,000 titles were confiscated and every copy was to be destroyed. Often, such works would be discovered by a non-governmental party loyalist committed to the cause. The representative of the Allied forces admitted that the order in principle was no different from the Nazi book burnings, although unlike the burnings, the measure was seen as a temporary part of the denazification program.

Another main goal of widespread censorship in West Germany was to protect youths from "poisonous" material. Government officials worked to prevent individuals under the age of eighteen from being exposed to content considered immoral, dangerous, or inappropriate. Tapes, films, books, magazines, and music were restricted and added to the list of "youth endangering writings" should they showcase improper content. Officials took it upon themselves to rid young West Germans of content which featured expletives, sexual interactions, excessive affection, war, or substance use.

Re-unified Germany (1990–present)
When the official government, the Federal Republic of Germany (Bundesrepublik Deutschland) took over in 1949, the limits on free speech were relaxed. The new German constitution from 1949 guaranteed freedom of press, speech, and opinion; the government continued to fight "anti-constitutional" activities, especially communist subversion during the Cold War. When East Germany ceased to exist and its territory became part of the Federal Republic of Germany in 1990, it became subject to the jurisdiction of the Federal Republic of Germany; the same protections and restrictions in West Germany apply to contemporary Germany. However, continued globalization and the advent of Internet marketing present a new host of complications to German censorship and information laws.

Publications violating laws (e.g., promoting Volksverhetzung or slander and libel) can be censored in today's Germany, with authors and publishers potentially subject to penalties. Strafgesetzbuch section 86a forms a relatively strict prohibition on the public display of "symbols of unconstitutional organizations" outside the context of "art or science, research or teaching". Such symbols include the swastika, the black flag of ISIL, and the Communist hammer and sickle, although the legality of some symbols is dependent on the context in which they are displayed -- a swastika may be displayed in a Buddhist temple, for example. Materials written or printed by organizations ruled to be anti-constitutional, like the NSDAP or the Red Army Faction (Baader-Meinhof Gang), have also been placed on the index. Public Holocaust denial is also prohibited and may be severely punished with up to five years in prison. A decision of a court that assumes that a publication is violating another person's personal rights may also lead to censoring (a newspaper for example can be forced not to publish private pictures).

One official censoring body in Germany is the Bundesprüfstelle für jugendgefährdende Medien (Federal Review Board for Media Harmful to Minors). The body manages a list of works that may be purchased by adults only, and the exhibition (for sale) is usually also prohibited. While this indexing can grant publicity to some works, publishers often try to avoid indexing, to make the media available to a wider audience. Methods to avoid inclusion on the list include the reduction of violent scenes in movies and the removal of Nazi symbols in games in cases of propaganda. 
Education purposes and the freedom of arts allow the appearance of Nazi symbols in films and games in other cases.

The Unterhaltungssoftware Selbstkontrolle (USK) is a privately organized body that also controls (electronic) media regarding their suitability for minors. The German Jugendschutzgesetz (Youth Protection Act) of 2003 made the former advisory-only label a de facto requirement; only products controlled by such a body may be publicly displayed for sale, with further restrictions applying to such media considered to be "18+".

In the 1990s and 2000s, the struggle against Scientology in Germany has been a major issue, as Scientology is viewed by the German authorities as a threat to democracy and a predatory commercial organization, not a religion. Scientology remains under government surveillance, and there have been attempts to ban the organization entirely.

In 2022, several German states have banned public displays of the letter "Z", a symbol used for supporters of the Russian invasion of Ukraine. "The Russian attack on Ukraine is a crime and whoever publicly approves of this war can thereby become criminally liable," said Marek Wede, a spokesperson for Germany's Interior Ministry. Critics of this policy note that banning the public display of the letter "Z" does not assist Ukraine and that it may embolden supporters of Russia who already claim to feel victimized.

Religious censorship
In 2002, there was a legal controversy regarding the  "Power for Living" campaign by the Christian Arthur S. DeMoss Foundation featuring celebrities Cliff Richard and Bernhard Langer. The TV advertisements for their book were banned because they were considered as "advertising a worldview or religion", which is forbidden by § 7 section 8 of the state treaty on broadcasting (Rundfunkstaatsvertrag) and European laws on media. For its posters, newspaper adverts and leaflets, however, there was no such problem.

Network Enforcement Act
The Network Enforcement Act or NetzDG which was passed in the Bundestag in 2017 has been criticized heavily by politicians, human rights groups, journalists and academics for incentivising social media platforms to pre-emptively censor valid and lawful expression, and making them the arbiter of what constitutes free expression and curtailing freedom of speech in Germany.

See also
Nazi propaganda

References

External links
"Signs - Books - Networks" virtual exhibition of the German Museum of Books and Writing, i.a. with a thematic module on censorship in Germany